Choi Jung-won (born May 1, 1981) is a South Korean singer and actor. He initially rose to fame as a member of South Korean duo UN debuting with the single "Voice Mail" in 2000. After the duo disbanded in 2005, his fame increased as an actor.

Filmography

Television series

References

External links
 

1981 births
K-pop singers
Living people
People from Seoul
Male actors from Seoul
Singers from Seoul
South Korean male television actors
20th-century South Korean male singers
South Korean pop singers
South Korean radio presenters
Kyonggi University alumni
21st-century South Korean male actors
21st-century South Korean male singers